Derek Moritz is an Australian former rugby league footballer who played in the 1960s and 1970s.

A specialist winger, Derek Moritz was a Manly junior who was graded at Manly-Warringah Sea Eagles in 1967. Moritz played for Manly between 1967–1972, and played on the wing in the 1970 Grand Final. He moved to the North Sydney Bears for two seasons between 1973–1974 before retiring.

References

Manly Warringah Sea Eagles players
North Sydney Bears players
Australian rugby league players
Living people
Year of birth missing (living people)
Rugby league wingers
Place of birth missing (living people)